I Belong may refer to:

 "I Belong" (Candice Alley song)
 "I Belong" (Kathy Kirby song)
 I Belong (film), a 2012 Norwegian drama film